Aachener Zeitung ( Aachen Newspaper, AZ) is a daily newspaper published in Aachen, Germany. It is printed, alongside the daily Aachener Nachrichten (AN), by Mediahuis in the Rhenish format.

History 
The AZ was founded in 1946 as Aachener Volkszeitung (AVZ) by Jakob Schmitz, Josef Hofmann, Albert Maas and Johannes Ernst, first printed on 22 February 1946. It was the first free paper published by Germans after World War II.  The paper was renamed Aachener Zeitung on 6 March 1996. The paper was printed initially only two or three times a week, but daily every working day from 1 September 1949; it is sold mainly by subscription and the circulation is about 112,000 copies.

The paper supplies news from around the world, but with a focus on the region, its politics, economy, culture, sports and weather, for readers in Aachen, Eschweiler, Geilenkirchen and Jülich.

Bernd Mathieu is the current editor-in-chief, of the Aachener Zeitung from 1995 and of the Aachener Nachrichten from 2003. The concept of two newspapers in one Redaktion was then new for Germany. Mathieu is a lecturer at the Aachen University of Applied Sciences for Digital Business in media and communications studies. He is a member of the jury of the journalism prize Theodor Wolff Prize.

Mathieu initiated online news service, namely a digital daily evening news "AmAbend" with photo galleries and videos, provided from 7 pm, in addition to the printed papers which include weekly specials on Wednesdays and Sundays.

Awards 
 Theodor Wolff Prize 2007, Marlon Gego, Am Ende der Illusion
 European Newspaper Award, several times, including 2001, 2012 and 2016.

References

External links 
 
 Aachener Zeitung flickr.com
 Aachener Zeitung 4imn.com
 Aachener Zeitung and Aachener Nachrichten / Die Netze der Zukunft bauen auf Akeptanz (in German) Flexible Elektrische Netze 29 October 2014
 Drei Awards für AN und AZ Aachener Zeitung, 16 November 2016

German-language newspapers
1946 establishments in Germany
Newspapers established in 1946
Daily newspapers published in Germany